Chad Eagle (born 24 August 1971 in Auckland, New Zealand) is a New Zealand rugby league footballer who formerly played for the New Haven Warriors in the AMNRL. His position is at lock. He previously played professional rugby union in England for Bristol RFC and London Irish.

References

External links 
 http://www.guinnesspremiership.com/112_146.php?player=7695&includeref=dynamic
 https://web.archive.org/web/20061115171726/http://www.ercrugby.com/eng/36_4571.php?player=5785

1971 births
Living people
Bristol Bears players
Expatriate rugby league players in the United States
Expatriate rugby union players in England
London Irish players
New Haven Warriors players
New Zealand expatriate rugby league players
New Zealand expatriate rugby union players
New Zealand expatriate sportspeople in England
New Zealand expatriate sportspeople in the United States
New Zealand rugby union players
New Zealand rugby league players
Rugby league locks
Rugby league props